Caribbean Sun Airlines Inc., trading as World Atlantic Airlines is an American airline operating on-demand and scheduled charter services. Its corporate headquarters are located in Virginia Gardens, Florida.

History
The airline was founded in September 2002 as Caribbean Sun Airlines. in Fort Lauderdale, Florida and began operations in January 2003 with flights from Luis Muñoz Marín International Airport in San Juan de Puerto Rico to Tortola, using the Bombardier Dash 8 Q100. On the flights, Caribbean Sun cooperated with the Antiguan sister company Caribbean Star Airlines, which also belonged to the Stanford Financial Group and enabled connecting flights to other Caribbean islands.

Flight operations ceased towards the end of January 2007. The resumption of the same under the name Merengue Airlines Dominicana, which was sought after a subsequent change of ownership was also unsuccessful, and so Caribbean Sun Airlines was finally sold to Tomas Romero, who renamed the company to World Atlantic Airlines. The company, which from then on only operates under this name, then focused on the ACMI charter area.

World Atlantic was one of the charter providers to Myrtle Beach Direct Air until the airline's bankruptcy in 2012, and was fined by the Department of Transportation in 2012 for regulatory violations in connection with this business. Since 2013, World Atlantic has acted as a charter provider to the United States Immigration and Customs Enforcement for deportation of individuals from the United States and recently per the NY Post delivering immigrants to Westchester NY.

In April 2013, World Atlantic transported Venezuelan voters from Miami to New Orleans to vote in the Venezuelan presidential election.

In September 2017, World Atlantic Airlines also entered into a partnership with Venezuelan airline Avior Airlines, having previously worked with LASER Airlines as part of the ACMI charter. As part of the business relationship with Avior Airlines, World Atlantic operated ACMI charter flights to Fort Lauderdale and Miami.

Fleet

Current fleet

As of September 2022, World Atlantic Airlines operates the following aircraft:

Former fleet
World Atlantic Airlines formerly operated the following aircraft:

Accidents and incidents
On April 20, 2018, A World Atlantic McDonnell Douglas MD-83 (registration N807WA) suffered a right hand main landing gear collapsed during landing rollout at Alexandria International Airport, in Louisiana, USA. Due to the gear failure, the right wing dragged on the runway creating a friction fire which was quickly put out by the airport rescue and firefighting personnel. The aircraft operated on a flight on behalf of the U.S. Immigration and Customs Enforcement and originated from Chicago-O'Hare International Airport. None of the 101 passengers on board were injured, but the aircraft suffered significant damage and was later written off as irreparable.

References

External links

 World Atlantic official page

Charter airlines of the United States
Airlines based in Florida
Airlines established in 2002
2002 establishments in Florida
Companies based in Miami-Dade County, Florida